Bereke Bank (KASE:SBER) is a Kazakhstani commercial bank. The head office is in Almaty, Kazakhstan.

History

Texakabank
Texakabank was established in 1993 as a joint Kazakh-American bank. Its capital as of October 1, 2005 was 2.7 billion tenge ($20 million), assets - 23.3 billion tenge ($175 million), loan portfolio - 14.9 billion tenge ($112 million). Net profit for 9 months of 2005 amounted to 783 million tenge ($5.9 million).

The main owners of Texakabank in 2005 were the head of the United Central Bank (USA, Texas) Gregory Studer (81.5%) and the head of the Kazakhstan representative office of Finintex (USA) Valery Gekko (5%). Finintex previously carried out a deal for Texakabank to purchase the Russian Metrobank.

The bank had more than 20 branches in Almaty, Atyrau and Uralsk, since 2001 it was part of the deposit insurance system of Kazakhstan.

At the end of July 2006, 80% of the share in the authorized capital of Texakabank was bought by Sberbank of Russia. According to media reports, the approximate amount of the transaction then amounted to $100 million. At the end of 2006, Sberbank increased its stake in Texakabank from 80% to 99.99%. According to the results of 2006, Texakabank took 278th place among the banks of the CIS and 15th place among the banks of Kazakhstan in terms of assets. As of January 2007, assets amounted to 27.3 billion tenge, liabilities - 22.9 billion tenge, equity - 4.4 billion tenge.

Sberbank Kazakhstan
At the beginning of 2007, the bank was renamed into the Subsidiary Bank Joint Stock Company Sberbank of Russia. In 2007, the credit institution received a license to conduct banking and other operations carried out by banks in national and foreign currencies. In the same year, the bank's authorized capital was increased by almost 15 times and amounted to 29 billion tenge (more than $240 million), which allowed it to become one of the 10 largest banks in Kazakhstan in terms of authorized capital.

In 2009, by decision of the board of the Kazakhstan Stock Exchange (KASE), Sberbank of Russia was given the status of a market maker of the Russian ruble (and since 2011, the US dollar and since 2014, the Chinese yuan). In 2010, the loan portfolio of SB Sberbank JSC exceeded 100 billion tenge. Two years later, the bank took sixth place in the banking system of Kazakhstan with a share of over 5%, and its capital by 15 billion tenge due to the placement of 2 million ordinary shares. At the beginning of 2020, SB Sberbank JSC already occupied the 2nd place in terms of assets among the banks of Kazakhstan and had a branch network consisting of 101 structural divisions.

Sanctions and sale
In connection with the Russian invasion of Ukraine, the parent Sberbank came under UK and US sanctions in April 2022, and in July under European Union sanctions. As a result, the assets of him and his daughters were frozen, and any interaction of American individuals and legal entities is prohibited. In Kazakhstan, the Sber KZ application was removed from online stores for iOS and Android mobile phones, the bank was disconnected from the SWIFT international interbank system.

In mid-April, under an assignment agreement, Halyk Bank bought out a part of the loan portfolio of retail business customers from SB Sberbank JSC. This transaction affected car loans issued under the program of concessional lending of the Development Bank of Kazakhstan, part of unsecured loans, loans for urgent needs and mortgage loans. The total volume of principal debt on transferred loans amounted to 330 billion tenge (as of April 1, 2022, the loan portfolio of consumer loans of SB Sberbank JSC was 1.1 trillion tenge).

At the same time, the Russian Sberbank began to look for a buyer for its Kazakhstani subsidiary, and the Office of Foreign Assets Control (OFAC) of the US Treasury issued a license setting a deadline for curtailing operations with SB Sberbank JSC until July 12, 2022. The bank began to feel the outflow of customer funds. After falling under the sanctions, the clients of the Kazakh “daughter” of Sberbank withdrew about 38% of their funds from it.

In May, the media reported that one of the main contenders for the asset was the Baiterek national holding, controlled by the government of the Republic of Kazakhstan, with which the European Bank for Reconstruction and Development (EBRD) may participate in the transaction. In June, the head of the EBRD, Odile Renaud-Basso, announced that her bank could recapitalize SB Sberbank JSC when it changes ownership. The following month, OFAC extended the license to complete transactions with SB Sberbank JSC for another three months, until October 11, 2022. On August 23, it was announced the signing of an agreement on the sale of all Sberbank shares in SB Sberbank JSC to the national management holding Baiterek.

On September 1, the Baiterek holding and Sberbank of the Russian Federation closed the deal for the sale of Sberbank Kazakhstan. At the same time, plans were announced to rename the organization to Bereke Bank (bereke in Kazakh means abundance, prosperity). On September 21, the bank completed its re-registration and became known as Bereke Bank.

In February 2023, the U.S. Treasury Department announced it would lift the sanction over the bank on March 6.

Owners and management
From January 2020 - July 2022 - Chairman of the Board Tenizbaev Eldar.

On March 11, 2020, Timur Kozintsev was elected Chairman of the Board of Directors.

Since July 2022, Nursultan Taskaranov has been appointed Chairman of the Board of SB Sberbank JSC.

On November 17, 2022, Andrey Timchenko has been appointed Chairman of the Board of Bereke Bank.

Indexes
In September 2020, the bank assets reached 2.824 trillion tenge.  The organizational structure included 95 groups; 13 of them are branches.

References

External links

Banks of Kazakhstan
Banks established in 1993
Economy of Almaty
Sberbank of Russia